Prince Michael Petrović-Njegoš of Montenegro (14 September 1908 – 24 March 1986) was the third (but eldest surviving) son of Prince Mirko of Montenegro, Grand Voivode of Grahovo and Zeta (1879–1918), and Natalija Konstantinović, a cousin of Aleksandar Obrenović of Serbia. He was pretender to the throne of Montenegro, holding the title Grand Duke of Grahovo and Zeta, in succession to his father. King Nicholas I of Montenegro was Michael's grandfather. Michael had recognized and acknowledged the Unification of Montenegro with Serbia, renouncing the throne. In World War II he was held prisoner by the Nazis after refusing to take up the throne of the Axis forces' re-established Montenegrin puppet-state. During the period of Yugoslav socialism, he was an active member of the Serb diaspora revolutionary organization and a diplomatic worker against the socialist government led by Marshal Tito.

He was a member of the Crown Council of King Peter II of Yugoslavia.

Early life
Michael was born in Podgorica in 1908, the son of Prince Mirko of Montenegro. In 1916, the defence of Montenegro against the invasion by Austria-Hungary during the First World War collapsed and he, along with the rest of the royal family, fled to Italy. There, he briefly attended a boarding school in Naples before joining his mother, who had taken up residence in Eastbourne in the United Kingdom where he completed his primary education.

Accession
After his grandfather Nikola died in 1921, the defunct throne was inherited by Danilo, Crown Prince of Montenegro. However, Danilo unexpectedly abdicated a few days later and his nephew the young Michael (who succeeded him as pretender) "reigned" as King Mihailo I under the guidance of a regent. On 14 September 1929 the Regency of General Anto Gvozdenović ended and Mihailo renounced his dynasty's claim to the throne of Montenegro and declared allegiance to the Kingdom of Yugoslavia. In gratitude, the King of Yugoslavia, Alexander I rewarded Prince Mihailo with a pension from the Civil List.

The Axis Proposition
In 1941, following the Fall of France, Prince Mihailo and his wife were arrested by the German occupation authorities. They were transferred to Germany and were held at a castle on the shores of Lake Constance. It was here that they were visited by Count Galeazzo Ciano and Joachim von Ribbentrop and were offered the throne of a new, independent Kingdom of Montenegro, but under Italian and German protection and guidance. He rejected this offer and remained imprisoned in Germany until his aunt, the Queen of Italy (Elena of Montenegro), secured their release in 1943. They returned to France only to be arrested by the German authorities and transferred to an internment camp at Jezeří Castle in occupied Czechoslovakia. The couple's son Prince Nicholas of Montenegro was born in 1944 in France, in Saint-Nicolas-du-Pélem, Brittany.

The Communist Proposition
At the end of the war Michael, his wife and infant son were released; they returned to France, taking up residence in Paris. Shortly after this he began talking to Marshal Tito of the newly socialist Yugoslavia and was invited to visit the country. In 1947 the young family took up residence in Belgrade and Prince Mihailo accepted the position as Head of Protocol at the Ministry for Foreign Affairs. Prince Mihailo was able to visit Montenegro which he had not seen since 1916, and realized that the memory of his family was still alive amongst the people. Eventually disappointed with Tito, he returned to France with his family in June 1948.

Opposition to Communist Dictatorship
From its founding in 1946, Michael Petrovich spent his years as an active political dissident of the Communist regime and worked to bring about its downfall. He was a member of the revolutionary Serb Liberation Movement Fatherland, aimed at gathering the Serb diaspora and internal dissidents in an effort to destroy the Yugoslav Communists.

Later life and death
Following his break with the government of Yugoslavia, the money he received from the civil list was terminated. Soon after, he and his wife divorced and he remained in exile until his death in 1986. Their son, Nicholas, was brought up by his mother. Prince Mihailo is buried in the Serbian Orthodox Church cemetery in Paris.

Marriage and children
Michael married in Paris on 27 January 1941 Geneviève Denise Charlotte Prigent (4 December 1919, in Saint-Brieuc – 26 January 1990, in Lannion), second daughter of Dr. François Marie Prigent (Fontenay-sous-Bois, 8 March 1883 - Saint-Brieuc, 20 August 1947), a surgeon in Saint-Brieuc, and wife (Neuilly-sur-Seine, 17 October 1905) Blanche Victorine Eugénie Bitte (Paris, 14 October 1883 - Saint-Brieuc, 3 December 1958), paternal granddaughter of Georges François Clair Prigent (Rospez, 2 April 1848 - Lannion, 29 August 1912) and wife Marie Françoise Kergus (Ploumilliau, 30 September 1857 - Lannion, 18 November 1897) and maternal granddaughter of Joseph Emile Bitte (Guermange, 22 February 1839 - Paris, 1 November 1896) and wife (Guermange, 17 June 1865) Marie Anne Victorine Renner (Guermange, 22 February 1843 - Paris, 26 July 1913). They divorced on 11 April/August 1949 in Paris. Shortly after, Geneviève started a career of orthoptist in Trébeurden.
They had one child: 
 Nicholas, Prince of Montenegro (b. Saint-Nicolas-du-Pélem, France, 7 July 1944)

Ancestors

Works
 Njegoš's Chapel on Lovćen - Sacred Place
 "From My Memoirs", The Serb National Defense, 1961, Windsor

References

External links
The Njegoskij Fund Public Project : Biography of Prince Michel of Montenegro (1908–1986).
The Njegoskij Fund Public Project : Biography of Genevieve Prigent, Militant Princess and French Resistant (1919–1990).
 Genealogy, Chronology, Notes : Biography of Michael I of Montenegro (footnotes in English).

1908 births
1986 deaths
Petrović-Njegoš dynasty
Princes of Montenegro
Pretenders to the Montenegrin throne
Yugoslav anti-communists
Yugoslav dissidents
Serbs of Montenegro
Montenegrin people of Serbian descent
Child pretenders